Keith Mason may refer to:

 Keith Mason (judge) (born 1947), judge in New South Wales, Australia
 Keith Mason (rugby league) (born 1982), English born professional rugby league footballer
 Keith Mason (scientist) (born 1951), chief executive of the Science and Technology Facilities Council
 Keith Mason (activist), founder of Personhood USA
 Keith Mason (footballer) (born 1958), former professional footballer